Talvitie is a Finnish surname. Notable people with the surname include:

Heikki Talvitie (born 1939), Finnish diplomat
Helge Talvitie (born 1941), Finnish politician
Mari-Leena Talvitie, Finnish politician
Pentti Talvitie (1922–2003), Finnish diplomat
Tiia-Maria Talvitie (born 1994), Finnish biathlete
Virpi Talvitie (born 1961), Finnish illustrator and graphic artist

Finnish-language surnames